The Silver Logie for Most Popular New Talent is an award presented at the Australian TV Week Logie Awards. The award recognises the popularity of a new talent in an Australian program. It may or may not be their first television appearance, however it is their first major television role.

It was first awarded at the 22nd Annual TV Week Logie Awards ceremony, held in 1980 and originally called Most Popular New Talent. This award category was eliminated in 1999 and replaced by the Most Popular New Male Talent and Most Popular New Female Talent categories. After a 15-year absence, the Most Popular New Talent category was reintroduced in 2014 to replace the gender specific categories. It was briefly renamed Best New Talent (2016-2017). From 2018, the award category name was reverted to Most Popular New Talent.

The winner and nominees of Most Popular New Talent are chosen by the public through an online voting survey on the TV Week website. Neighbours and Home and Away have the most recipients of this award, with four wins each.

Winners and nominees

Multiple wins

See also
George Wallace Memorial Logie for Best New Talent
Graham Kennedy Award for Most Outstanding Newcomer
Logie Award for Most Popular New Male Talent
Logie Award for Most Popular New Female Talent

References

Awards established in 1980